"The hand of God" was a handling goal scored by Argentine footballer Diego Maradona during the Argentina v England quarter finals match of the 1986 FIFA World Cup. The goal was illegal under association football rules because Maradona used his hand to score, but because the referees did not have a clear view of the play and video assistant referee technology did not exist at the time, it stood to give Argentina a 1–0 lead. Argentina went on to win 2–1, with Maradona scoring a second goal known as the "Goal of the Century," en route to claiming the World Cup.

The goal's name derives from Maradona's initial response on whether he scored it illegally, stating it was made "a little with the head of Maradona, and a little with the hand of God". Maradona later said he considered the goal to be "symbolic revenge" for the United Kingdom's victory over Argentina in the Falklands War four years earlier.

The goal 

Six minutes into the second half of the game, Maradona took the ball out of the box with his left leg and passed it to teammate Jorge Valdano. Valdano tried to take on several English defenders, but the ball was intercepted and thrown back and forth and kicked towards England's goal by English midfielder Steve Hodge.

Because of the position of the players, Maradona would have been caught offside, but as the ball came off an opponent, there was no offside offence. Alone inside the penalty box and with the ball dropping down, Maradona contested the ball with goalkeeper Peter Shilton, who stood  taller than Maradona. Shilton jumped forward with his right hand, while Maradona did so with his left arm outstretched. Maradona's fist, which was raised close to his head, touched the ball first and hit the ball into England's goal. Maradona began to celebrate while glancing sideways at the referee and the linesman for confirmation. He then fully celebrated the goal when it was given.

Tunisian referee Ali Bennaceur gave the goal, but after the English players' protests he sought the advice of his second linesman who confirmed the goal.

Mexican photographer Alejandro Ojeda Carbajal immortalized this moment in a photograph in which Maradona can be seen hitting the ball with his hand.

"History is already written" 
In 2005, 19 years after scoring the controversial goal, Maradona confessed on a program La Noche del 10, that the goal was actually scored with his hand.

Several world media outlets reported the news, creating controversy. Even Peter Shilton rejected the apology, arguing that it was now too late. Maradona, a few days after the article came out, denied everything, saying that the newspaper had misquoted him. Maradona responded:

 A few days later, The Sun newspaper confirmed that it had modified the interpretation of Maradona's words and asked to change the name to The Devil's Hand. In the original text of the interview, it could be seen that Maradona had never asked for forgiveness for the goal.

Falklands War and "symbolic revenge" 
In the 2019 documentary film Diego Maradona directed by Asif Kapadia, Maradona links the event to the Falklands War four years earlier, saying "[w]e, as Argentinians, didn't know what the military was up to. They told us that we were winning the war. But in reality, England was winning 20–0. It was tough. The hype made it seem like we were going to play out another war. I knew it was my hand. It wasn't my plan but the action happened so fast that the linesman didn't see me putting my hand in. The referee looked at me and he said: 'Goal.' It was a nice feeling like some sort of symbolic revenge against the English."

Ivan Lopez-Muniz wrote in 2017 that in Argentina the "entire nation", including the Government and the Argentine Football Association, still "praises the most blatant act of cheating ever caught on tape", partly because "Argentines are humans, and humans are hypocrites" but also because of a long history of grievances against the United Kingdom, that includes not only the 1982 Falklands War, but other matters such as England manager Alf Ramsay calling the Argentine players animals after Argentine Captain Antonio Rattín was sent off against England in the 1966 World Cup, as well as Britain's invasions of the future Argentine capital Buenos Aires in 1806 and 1807, and its seizure of the Falkland Islands (known to Argentines as Las Malvinas) "in 1832". Lopez-Muniz concluded that, because of the combination of high and low standards, "Quite simply, it means that Maradona, on that day, was an Englishman."

Subsequent use 
The "Hand of God" became a popular phrase and is still referred to around the world. Some other famous football handballs are:

In the first round of the 1990 World Cup between Argentina and the Soviet Union, in the first half of the 2–0 win, a Soviet attack failed as Maradona intercepted the shot with "the hand of God" without the referee noticing.
In the 2004 AFC Asian Cup Final between China and Japan, Koji Nakata scored Japan's second goal by hand, which would later be stood, much to the dismay of Chinese fans as the Chinese hosts lost 3–1 to the eventual champions.
During a league match against Espanyol on 9 June 2007, Argentinian Barcelona player Lionel Messi scored by launching himself at the ball and guiding it past the goalkeeper with his hand in similar fashion to Maradona's Hand of God goal.
During the final minutes of the second leg of the play-off for the 2010 World Cup between Ireland and France, William Gallas scored the decisive goal from a Thierry Henry assist that gave France a 2–1 aggregate victory and qualified them for the World Cup. Controversy followed immediately as replays showed Henry repeatedly centering the ball with his hands moments prior to passing the ball to Gallas. Despite protests from the Irish side, Swedish referee Martin Hansson did not admonish Henry and allowed the goal. After the match ended, sports media from around the world gave Henry's cross several nicknames, ranging from "The New Hand of God", to the more scathing "The Hand of Frog", the latter using an insulting term towards French people.
Uruguayan footballer Luis Suárez illegally stopped with his hand a likely goal from Ghanaian Dominic Adiyiah in the quarter-finals of the 2010 FIFA World Cup. Suárez was shown the red card; nonetheless, Uruguay survived and overcame Ghana on penalties. At the subsequent press conference, the striker said he had done so with the "Hand of God", and it later became popularly known as "Hand of God 2.0".
On 11 February 2020, in Group G of the 2020 AFC Cup, Joshua Grommen of Ceres-Negros F.C. scored the second goal of their game against Preah Khan Reach Svay Rieng FC by diverting the ball into the net with his hand. Despite vocal protests from the opposing side, the goal was given as officials had failed to notice the blatant handball.

The legacy of “Hand of God” has extended beyond the realm of football. Paolo Sorrentino’s semi-autobiographical 2021 drama is named after the incident and references Diego Maradona’s influence on 1980s Naples.

Maradona’s shirt 
After the game Maradona swapped his shirt in the tunnel with Steve Hodge. After many years of requests to sell the shirt and a period of 20 years where it was on  loan at the National Football Museum, in 2022 Hodge placed it up for auction with auctioneers Sotheby's. On 4 May 2022, the shirt sold at auction for £7,100,000, a world record for a piece of sports memorabilia.

See also 
 Maradona, the Hand of God
 The Hand of God (film)

Explanatory footnotes

References

External links 

 
 Top 10 Famous Soccer Handballs

1986 FIFA World Cup
Football in England
Football in Argentina
Diego Maradona
FIFA World Cup controversies
Cheating in sports